1986 ACC tournament may refer to:

 1986 ACC men's basketball tournament
 1986 ACC women's basketball tournament
 1986 Atlantic Coast Conference baseball tournament